Polish Armament in 1939–45 article is a list of equipment used by Polish army before and during the Invasion of Poland, foreign service in British Commonwealth forces and last campaign to Germany with the Red Army in 1945.

Aircraft

Local designs 
Lublin R-VIIIbis
Lublin R-VIIID
Lublin R-XIIIE (prototype)
Lublin R-XIIIF (prototype)
Lublin R-XIIIG (prototype)
Lublin R-XVIB
Lublin R-XXII (project)
Lublin R-XXIII (R-XIIIDr.)(project)
LWS-3 Mewa
LWS-7 Mewa II (project)
PWS-16
PWS-18
PWS-26
PWS-27 (project)
PWS-28 (project)
PWS-29 (project)
PWS-24bis
PWS-35 Ogar
PZL P.7a
PZL P.11c
PZL P.11g Kobuz (prototype)
PZL.50 Jastrząb (prototype)
PZL.23A Karaś A
PZL.23B Karaś B / Karaś II
PZL.37B Łoś B
PZL.38 Wilk (prototypes)
PZL.43 Karaś
PZL.46 Sum (prototype)
PZL.48 Lampart (project)
PZL.49 Miś (project)
PZL.54 Ryś (project)
RWD-8
RWD-13
RWD-13S
RWD-14 Czapla
RWD-17
RWD-17W (prototype)
Bartel BM-4a
Bartel BM-4c
Bartel BM-4e
Bartel BM-4f
Bartel BM-4g
Bartel BM-4h
Bartel BM-5

Armament and other equipment on combat aircraft 
 Aerial photo cameras (for reconnaissance use)
  M1919 Browning machine gun
  Vickers E machine gun, an air-cooled version of the common Vickers MG
  Vickers F machine gun, a magazine-fed version of Vickers E
   machine gun
  KM Wz 36 machine gun
  KM Wz 37 machine gun
  Nkm wz.38 FK Model D automatic cannon
Oerlikon FF 20 mm Cannon
40 kg bomb
50 kg bomb
600 kg bomb
700 kg bomb
1,000 kg bomb
2,600 kg bomb

Foreign aircraft 
Schreck FBA-17
LeO H-13
LeO H-135
Latham 43
Avro Tutor Mk. I (2 examples)
Breguet Bre XIX B.2
CANT Z.506B Airone (1 example)
Fokker F.VIIb-3m/M (21 examples)

Aircraft in use by Polish Air Force in France (1939–1940) 
Bloch MB.152
Caudron C.714 C1 "Cyclone"
Koolhoven F.K.58
Morane-Saulnier M.S.406

Aircraft in use by Polish Air Force in Great Britain (1940–1947) 
Avro Lancaster
Boulton Paul Defiant
Bristol Beaufighter
de Havilland Mosquito
Fairey Battle
Handley Page Halifax
Hawker Hurricane
Supermarine Spitfire
Taylorcraft Auster
Vickers Wellington
Vickers Warwick
Westland Lysander
Consolidated B-24 Liberator
North American B-25 Mitchell
North American P-51 Mustang

Aircraft in use by Polish Air Force in Soviet Union (1943–1945) 
Yakovlev Yak-1b
Yakovlev Yak-9
Ilyushin Il-2m
Petlyakov Pe-2
Polikarpov UTI-4 / I-16 UTI
Polikarpov U-2 / Po-2
Shcherbakov Shche-2
Yakovlev UT-2

Tanks, armored cars and other military vehicles

Tankettes/light tanks 
TK-1
TK-2
TK-3
TK
wz.31
TKF
TKW
TKD
TKS-B
Samochód pancerny wz. 28
Samochód pancerny wz. 29
Samochód pancerny wz. 34
wz.39
TKS
wz.33
Renault FT (France)
CWS FT-17
Vickers E Twin Turret
Vickers E Single Turret
Vickers E Mark A & B
VAU33dw
VAU33jw
7TPdw (dwuwieżowy-twin turret; only two wz. 30 Brownings)
7TPjw (jednowieżowy-single turret; 37 mm Bofors anti-tank gun) and its improved version 9TP or PT-9
PZInż.322
PZInż. 130 amphibious tank
PZInż. 140(4TP) reconnaissance tank
Renault R35
Polish/Soviet T-70
Hotchkiss H35

Medium tanks 
10TP wheel & track fast tank (only prototypes)
14TP Medium tank (only prototype never completed)
20/25TP Medium tank (never entered production)
Matilda Mk I – training only for Polish units in UK
Cromwell Cruiser Tank
M4 Sherman – lend-lease via UK
T34/76
T34/85

Self-propelled vehicles/Tank destroyers 
Polish/American T48
Polish/Soviet SU-57
Polish/Soviet SU-85
Polish/Soviet SU-100
Polish/Soviet ISU-122
Polish/Soviet ISU-152
Polish/Soviet SU-152

Heavy tanks 
Polish/Soviet JS-2 (IS-2)
Polish/Soviet JS-3 (IS-3)

Tank and armored car armaments 
7.5 mm MG
7.92 mm Hotchkiss-wz.25 MG
7.92 mm Colt–Browning-wz.30 TMG
13.2 mm MG
20 mm FK AT Automatic Cannon
25 mm Hotchkiss anti-tank gun
Bofors 37 mm
37 mm SA-18 Puteaux L/21
3.7 cm PaK 36 (captured)
47 mm Tank Gun

Captured German/Italian vehicles 
German
Sd.Kfz. 251/1 ausf. D
Sd.Kfz. 250/10
Panzer III
Panzer IV
Panzer V
Steyr RSO
Italian
AB 41 Armored Car

Armored cars, motorcycles, trucks, half-tracks, jeeps 
Peugeot Armored Car
Samochód Pancerny Ford Tfc ("Ford Tfc Armored Car")
wz.28 (Citroën-Kegresse B2 10CV)
Motorcycles CWS M55
Motorcycles CWS M111 (Sokół 1000)
wz.29 Ursus
French Citroën-Kegresse P.14
French Citroën-Kegresse P.17
French Citroën-Kegresse P.19
Polski FIAT 508/518
PZInż.302 (Polski FIAT 508/518 variant)
Polski Fiat 621L 2.5 ton truck
ZIS-5/5V truck
C2P tow
Wz.34 Half Track
C4P Half Track
C7P
Samochód pancerny wz. 34 Armoured car model 1934
PZInż.342 4x4 artillery tractor (C5P)
wz.34 Halftrack
"Kubuś" improvised Armoured car/APC – 1 built during Warsaw Uprising
Polish/Soviet BA-64 Armored Car
Polish/Soviet BA-20 Armored Car
Polish/American M17 Halftrack
Polish/American Jeep
Studebaker US6 – US design also produced in USSR
Ursus A Ambulance
Ursus AW Bus
Ursus A Truck
Saurer 4BLDP Bus
Ursus TKS Tank Transporter
Ursus A TK Tank Transporter
Saurer 4BLDP TKS Tank Transporter
FT-17 4-wheel Road Transporter
Ursus A FT-17 Truck Transporter
"local Jeep" Polski Fiat 508
Polski Fiat 518

Armored trains and annex equipment 
FT17 Rail Transporter
TK Rail Transporter
"Drezyna Pancerno Motorowa R"(TK And FT Rail Transporter)
nr 11 "Danuta"
nr 12 "Poznańczyk"
nr 13 "Generał Sosnkowski"
nr 14 "Paderewski"
nr 15 "Śmierć"
nr 51 "Pierwszy Marszałek"
nr 52 "Piłsudczyk"
nr 53 "Śmiały"
nr 54 "Groźny"
nr 55 "Bartosz Głowacki"
Training armoured trains:
"Zagończyk"
"Stefan Czarniecki"

Improvised armoured trains 
Two of Warsaw Defence Command (Dowództwo Obrony Warszawy):
"nr 1"
"nr 2"

Light and heavy infantry armaments

Anti-aircraft guns, anti-tank guns and artillery pieces 
M-14/19 10.0 cm Artillery Cannon
vz 26 7.5 cm Artillery Cannon
M-97 7.5 cm Artillery Cannon
M-29 10.5 cm Artillery Cannon
M-17 15.5 cm Heavy Artillery Cannon
Bofors 4.0 cm Antiaircraft Cannon
Bofors 37 mm AT Cannon
Mortar M 31 (8 cm) -licence built French mortar M 27/31 Brandt
Mortar M 36 (4.6 cm)

Rifles, pistols, machine guns, and infantry weapons 
Bayonet Bagnet 28" – For use with Poln M29, Poln 98, Karabinek 1898 rifles and carbines
Infantry Rifle "Poln M29"- Calibre 7.9 mm Kbk wz. 1929
Infantry Rifle "Poln 98"- Calibre 7.9 mm Kb wz. 98a
Infantry Semi Automatic Self—repeating Rifle Kbsp wz. 1938M (only 150 made by the time of war)
Carbine "Karabinek 1898"- Calibre 7.9 mm
Carbine "Karabinek 91/98/25" (Mossin-Nagant 91)- Calibre 7.9 mm
Revolver Rewolwer Nagant wz. 30 - Calibre 7.62 mm
Pistol Pistolet Vis Vz-35 (Version 1935; development of Colt 1911; replaced Mauser on the Eastern Front: 500,000 made and issued by Germans in 1943 and 1944) (wz. 35 Vis)"- Calibre 9 mm
Bechowiec-1 Machine Pistol – Calibre 9 mm
Błyskawica Machine pistol – Calibre 9 mm
KIS Machine Pistol – Calibre 9 mm
Polski Sten machine pistol – Calibre 9 mm
ET-38 anti-tank grenade
Filipinka ET wz.40 hand grenade (250 g of cheddite or ammonal)
Sidolówka R wz.42 hand grenade (250 g of cheddite or amonite)
Anti Tank Rifle 7.92 mm "Karabin przeciwpancerny" wz.35 – Calibre 7.92 mm aka "Uruguay" (Platoon—level AT weapon)
Light Machine gun wz. 28 (Polish version of the Browning Automatic Rifle) caliber 7.9 mm
Heavy Machine Gun 30  (Polish-made clone of the American Browning M1917 heavy machine gun) caliber 7.92×57mm Mauser
Granatnik wz.36
Mosin Nagant

Weapons in use by Polish volunteers in foreign armies 
Fusil Mle 1907/15-M34" – Calibre 7.5 mm
Fusil Automatique 1918" (Semi-automatic) – Calibre 8 mm
Fusil Mle 1907" – Calibre 8 mm
Springfield M1903 – Calibre .30-06
Sten MK I – Calibre 9 mm
Sten MK II – Calibre 9mm
No3 MK I – Calibre .303
M1 Garand (Semi-automatic rifle) – Calibre .30
"Carabin M1" – Calibre .30
"Smith & Wesson Mod 1917" – Calibre 45
PPD-40 – Calibre 7.62 mm
PPD-34/38" – Calibre 7.62 mm
Tokarev 1930" – Calibre 7.62 mm
Mosin–Nagant M91/30 in 7.62 mm

Naval weapons

Surface vessels, submarines and other ships 
Destroyers
ORP Błyskawica
ORP Grom
ORP Burza
ORP Wicher
ORP Garland
ORP Orkan
ORP Huragan
[[ORP Piorun (G65)|ORP Piorun']]
Escort Destroyers
ORP KrakowiakORP Kujawiak
ORP Ślązak
Cruisers
ORP Dragon
 ORP Conrad
Heavy minelayer ORP GryfSubmarines
ORP Orzeł
ORP Sęp
ORP Wilk
ORP RyśORP ŻbikORP JastrząbORP Dzik
ORP Sokół
Torpedo vessel ORP MazurAuxiliary boat ORP NurekSea patrol boat ORP General HallerRiver patrol boat ORP Kraków''

Coastal artillery defenses 
Laskowski 152 mm Coastal cannon
"Smok Kaszubski" Improvised Armored train
Armored Train (unknown name)

Sea vessel armament 

120 mm/50 Cannon 
130 mm/40 cannon 
105 mm/4 cannon 
40 mm/60 anti-aircraft cannon 
550 mm torpedo launchers
100 mm/40 cannon 
40 mm/40 anti-aircraft cannon 
122 mm Cannon 
145 mm  cannon 
105 mm  cannon 
100 mm wz 1914/19P  cannon 
7.92 mm Hotchkiss cannon 
7.62 mm Maxim heavy machine gun
7.92 mm  Maxim 03 heavy machine gun 
13.2 mm  Hotchkiss 03 heavy machine gun
37 mm Puteaux wz. 85 cannon 
7.9 mm (1 cm) Maxim 08 heavy machine gun 
8 mm cannon
2.1 cm mortar
37 mm (1 cm) cannon
2 cm mortars Hotchkiss wz 30, 
76 mm  cannon 
75 mm  cannon 
7.92 mm  cannon
13.2 mm heavy machine guns

River boat local project 

Type I Fast Monitor 
Type MC Monitor

References